Kristjan Palusalu (until 1935 Kristjan Trossmann,  – 17 July 1987) was an Estonian heavyweight wrestler and Olympic winner. Palusalu became the first and only wrestler in Olympic history ever to win both the Greco-Roman and freestyle heavy weight events.

Palusalu was born in Varemurru village, Saulepi Parish, Lääne County (now Matsi village, Lääneranna Parish, Pärnu County) as one of eight children to Jüri and Liisu Trossmann. He is best remembered for winning two gold medals at the 1936 Olympic Games in Berlin. He was given the honor of carrying the Estonian flag to Olympiastadion. The triumph was celebrated across Estonia with Palusalu and other Estonian athletes touring the country by rail giving speeches. A third of the inhabitants of Tallinn turned out to greet him and the Estonian government granted him a farm.

After the Soviet Union occupied Estonia in 1940, Palusalu was sent to hard labour in Kotlas, Russia in 1941. He tried to escape with other prisoners but was captured after a few days. He was then sentenced to death together with his fellow fugitives but was given the chance to go to the front line to fight against Finland in the Continuation War. He deserted to the Finnish side in Northern Karelia, northwest of Lake Onega. According to one Finnish soldier, Mr. Suuperko, Palusalu and his friends shouted "Finnish boys do not shoot Estonians", when they crossed the lines. Palusalu was soon recognized by a person in the Finnish army, who had sports background (Heikki Savolainen).

He was imprisoned but then was allowed to return to his homeland, which was then under German occupation. After the return of the Soviet army in 1945 he was arrested again, but was later allowed to work as trainer and referee, he also participated in some competition in Estonia. He was not forgotten by the Estonian people. As one of the most popular sportsmen in Estonia throughout history, Kristjan Palusalu is one of the few who have become synonymous with the Estonian nation itself.

Palusalu was married to Ellen Saidla. The couple had a son, Jüri Palusalu.

Legacy
.
The international Kristjan Palusalu Memorial in Greco-Roman wrestling is held in Estonia from 1988.

References

External links
 
 
 
 
 

1908 births
1987 deaths
People from Lääneranna Parish
People from Kreis Wiek
Estonian male sport wrestlers
Olympic wrestlers of Estonia
Wrestlers at the 1936 Summer Olympics
Olympic gold medalists for Estonia
Olympic medalists in wrestling
Medalists at the 1936 Summer Olympics
European Wrestling Championships medalists
20th-century Estonian people
Burials at Metsakalmistu